Salvador Garcia Tampac (July 12, 1932 – January 1, 2008), better known by his screen name Cachupoy was a Filipino actor-comedian. His trademark is sporting hair that is parted in the middle. He was a mainstay of the Magandang Tanghali television program. He starred in films such as Sa Kabukiran, Sitak ni Jack, Rangers in the Wrong War (1987), A Man Called Tolonges (1981), and Pitong James Bonds (1966). He also starred in the "Andres de Saya" series (1980), (1983) and (1986) with Vic Vargas and Gloria Diaz and "Mahiwagang Singsing" (1986) with Lotlot de Leon. He dresses up like Charlie Chaplin and wears almost the same wardrobe as Chaplin. One of our golden and famous actors/comedian during the early days of cinema in the Philippines. Though he never carried a stick, like Charlie Chaplin did, he distinctively acts like him. Cachupoy was also known in his performances with Serafin Gabriel (a.k.a. Apeng Daldal) and with Arturo Vergara Medina (a.k.a. Bentot).

Early life
Cachupoy was born on July 12, 1932 in Sampaloc, Manila. He was the third child of Segundina Garcia and Meliton Tampac. He graduated from Juan Luna Elementary School, Roxas High School and reached the second year of Fine Arts (major in painting) at University of Santo Tomas. He dreamt of being an actor or a painter. Before getting in show business, he worked for a construction firm. He also acted in stage shows with the moniker "Susing." Lou Salvador Sr. gave him the name Cachupoy. It was Director Jose Miranda Cruz that gave him the first break in the movies. His first movie was "Tatlong Mabilis," 1965. He also starred in "Igorota" and "Ang Pulubi," from Nepumuceno Pictures. He also showed a flair for singing and was part of the trio The Millionaires which was also made up of Manok and Miniong Villegas. They broke up after three years of performing. He was under contract with Nepomuceno Productions and with ABS-CBN for television projects. His first television performance as a comedian was "Hiwaga Sa Bahay na Bato." His shows at Channel 3 were "Cuatro Vidas", "Winner Take All" and "Eddie and Nova Plus."

Career

Cachupoy's performance in the 1988 film 7 Pasiklab sa Army was given high praise by critic Lav Diaz for being very comedic, stating that he was better than even his comedian co-stars Don Pepot and Redford White in the film.

Later life and death
His last film was Ganti ng Api in 1991, then he quit and retired from the industry. Cachupoy died in 2008 in Manila, Philippines.

Filmography

References

External links

1932 births
2008 deaths
20th-century comedians
20th-century Filipino male actors
Filipino male comedians
Filipino male film actors
Filipino male television actors
Filipino television personalities
Place of birth missing